Talking Pictures is an occasional BBC Two television series which examines the lives and careers of well-known actors, as well as exploring various cinematic themes and genres. Episodes largely comprise interview clips from the BBC archives and vary in length between 30 and 60 minutes. With just two exceptions, the first 66 episodes were narrated by actress Sylvia Syms (2013-2019), following which the role was taken over by Celia Imrie (2020 onwards). Only one film, On the Waterfront, has been the subject of an episode in its own right. Episode 64 is notable in that it concerned not some aspect of the film-making industry itself, but rather was a look back at the career of film critic and longtime presenter of the BBC Film... programme, Barry Norman, who had died earlier in 2017.

Episodes
Since the BBC does not group episodes into distinct series on the programme website, they are listed below in strict chronological order (according to the date when an episode was first shown). Episodes have been repeated on an ad hoc basis at fairly regular intervals, but the complete series (as it stands currently) has never been shown sequentially.

Last updated 28 April 2022.

Transcripts and downloadable subtitles of some episodes in SRT/ASS (SSA) format are available from the Subsaga website.

Notes

References

External links
 .
 .

2013 British television series debuts
2010s British documentary television series
2020s British documentary television series
BBC television documentaries